In mathematics, the Grothendieck inequality states that there is a universal constant  with the following property. If Mij is an n × n (real or complex) matrix with
 

for all (real or complex) numbers si, tj of absolute value at most 1, then
 

for all vectors Si, Tj in the unit ball B(H) of a (real or complex) Hilbert space H, the constant  being independent of n. For a fixed Hilbert space of dimension d, the smallest constant that satisfies this property for all n × n matrices is called a Grothendieck constant and denoted .

The Grothendieck inequality and Grothendieck constants are named after Alexander Grothendieck, who proved the existence of the constants in a paper published in 1953.

Motivation and the operator formulation 
Let  be an  matrix.

Since  is linear, then it suffices to consider  such that  contains as many points as possible, and also  such that  is as large as possible.

One way to compute  is by solving the following quadratic integer program:

To see this, note that , and taking the maximum over  gives . This quadratic integer program can be relaxed to the following semidefinite program:

One can then ask the following natural question: How well does an optimal solution to the semidefinite program approximate ? The Grothendieck inequality provides an answer to this question: There exists a fixed constant  such that, for any , for any  matrix , and for any Hilbert space ,

Bounds on the constants

Grothendieck proved that  where  is defined to be .

 improved the result by proving that , conjecturing that the upper bound is tight.

Grothendieck constant of order d

Lower bounds

Upper bounds

Some historical data on best known upper bounds of :

Applications

Cut norm estimation 

 

The notion of cut norm is essential in designing efficient approximation algorithms for dense graphs and matrices.

 

This generalized definition of cut norm is crucial in the study of the space of graphons, and the two definitions of cut norm can be linked via the adjacency matrix of a graph.

An application of the Grothendieck inequality is to give an efficient algorithm for approximating the cut norm of a given real matrix ; specifically, given an  real matrix, one can find a number  such that

where  is an absolute constant. This approximation algorithm uses semidefinite programming.

We give a sketch of this approximation algorithm. Let  be  matrix defined by

Next, one can verify that , where

Now it suffices to design an efficient algorithm for approximating . We consider the following semidefinite program:

Then . The Grothedieck inequality implies that . Therefore, one can output  which satisfies

Szemerédi's regularity lemma 
Szemerédi's regularity lemma is a useful tool in graph theory, asserting (informally) that any graph can be partitioned into a controlled number of pieces that interact with each other in a pseudorandom way. Another application of the Grothendieck inequality is to produce a partition of the vertex set that satisfies the conclusion of Szemerédi's regularity lemma, via the cut norm estimation algorithm, in time that is polynomial in the upper bound of Szemerédi's regular partition size but independent of the number of vertices in the graph.

To that end, we construct an  matrix , where , defined by

Then for all ,

Hence, if  is not -regular, then . It follows that using the cut norm approximation algorithm together with the rounding technique, one can find in polynomial time  such that

Then the algorithm for producing a Szemerédi's regular partition follows from the constructive argument of Alon et al.

Variants of the Grothendieck inequality

Grothendieck inequality of a graph 
The Grothendieck inequality of a graph states that for each  and for each graph  without self loops, there exists a universal constant  such that every  matrix  satisfies that

The Grothendieck constant of a graph , denoted , is defined to be the smallest constant  that satisfies the above property.

Thus,

For , the -vertex complete graph, the Grothendieck inequality of  becomes

It turns out that . On one hand, we have . Indeed, the following inequality is true for any  matrix , which implies that  by the Cauchy-Schwarz inequality:

On the other hand, the matching lower bound  is due to Alon, Makarychev, Makarychev and Naor in 2006.

It is known that

and

L^p Grothendieck inequality 
In the application of the Grothendieck inequality for approximating the cut norm, we have seen that the Grothendieck inequality answers the following question: How well does an optimal solution to the semidefinite program  approximate , which can be viewed as an optimization problem over the unit cube? More generally, we can ask similar questions over convex bodies other than the unit cube.

For instance, the following inequality is due to Naor and Schechtman and independently due to Guruswami et al: For every  matrix  and every ,

where

The constant  is sharp in the inequality.

See also
Pisier–Ringrose inequality

References

External links
 (NB: the historical part is not exact there.)

Theorems in functional analysis
Inequalities